The New England Women's and Men's Athletic Conference (NEWMAC) is an intercollegiate athletic conference affiliated with the NCAA's Division III. Member institutions are located in the northeastern United States in the states of Connecticut and Massachusetts.

History

The NEWMAC was established in 1998, when the former New England Women's 8 Conference (NEW 8) voted to begin sponsoring conference play and championships for men. At this time, the conference expanded its membership to include Springfield College and the United States Coast Guard Academy.

The NEW 8 began play in 1985-86 as the New England Women's 6 Conference (NEW 6). Charter members were Babson College, Brandeis University, Massachusetts Institute of Technology (MIT), Smith College, Wellesley College and Wheaton College. Mount Holyoke College and Worcester Polytechnic Institute (WPI) joined in 1988 and the name was changed to the NEW 8 Conference. At the conclusion of the 1994–95 academic year, Brandeis University withdrew from the NEW 8 to join the University Athletic Association (where its men's sports competed at that time) and Clark University accepted membership, keeping the NEW 8's membership at eight institutions.

In March 2012, NEWMAC announced the addition of Emerson College as the 11th full member of the league starting in the 2013–14 academic year. With the addition of Emerson the NEWMAC began re-sponsoring the sport of men's lacrosse, adding an affiliate member, Massachusetts Maritime Academy. In July 2012, the conference welcomed Simmons College as an affiliate member to compete in the sport of rowing.

In April 2015, the conference office announced it would begin sponsoring football in the 2017 season, with Maine Maritime Academy, the United States Merchant Marine Academy and Norwich University as affiliate members. On September 29, 2015, NEWMAC announced the addition of the Catholic University of America as another associate member in football effective July 1, 2017, and on June 23, 2021, the conference added the State University of New York Maritime College (SUNY Maritime) as its new football affiliate in 2023, leaving the Eastern Collegiate Football Conference after the 2022 season.

In February 2022, the Landmark Conference announced that it would begin sponsoring football starting in the 2023–24 season, thus football affiliate, the Catholic University of America, will depart after the 2022–23 season.

Chronological timeline
 1985 - The NEWMAC was established as the New England Women's 6 Conference (NEW-6). Charter members included Babson College, Brandeis University, Massachusetts Institute of Technology (MIT), Smith College, Wellesley College and Wheaton College, effective beginning the 1985–86 academic year.
 1988 - The NEW-6 has been rebranded as the New England Women's 8 Conference (NEW-8), effective in the 1988–89 academic year.
 1988 - Mount Holyoke College and Worcester Polytechnic Institute (WPI) joined the NEW-8, effective in the 1988–89 academic year.
 1995 - Brandeis left the NEW-8 to fully align with its men's sports in the University Athletic Association (UAA), effective after the 1994–95 academic year.
 1995 - Clark University joined the NEW-8, effective in the 1995–96 academic year.
 1998 - The NEW-8 offered men's sports and was rebranded as the New England Women's and Men's Athletic Conference (NEWMAC), effective in the 1998–99 academic year.
 1998 - Springfield College and the United States Coast Guard Academy (Coast Guard) were the 1st schools with men's and women's sports to join the newly branded NEWMAC, effective in the 1998–99 academic year.
 2012 - Simmons University joined the NEWMAC as an associate member for rowing, effective in the 2012–13 academic year.
 2013 - Emerson College joined the NEWMAC, effective the 2013–14 academic year.
 2013 - The NEWMAC had absorbed the Pilgrim Lacrosse League to re-add men's lacrosse as a sponsored sport, while having the addition of Massachusetts Maritime Academy as an associate member for that sport, effective in the 2014 spring season (2013-14 academic year).
 2015 - The NEWMAC added football as a sponsored sport, while having the additions as associate members for that sport: Maine Maritime Academy, Norwich University, the United States Merchant Marine Academy and the Catholic University of America, effective beginning the 2017 fall season (2017-18 academic year).
 2019 - Massachusetts Maritime left the NEWMAC as an associate member for men's lacrosse, effective after the 2019 spring season (2018-19 academic year).
 2022 - The Catholic University of America announced that it will leave the NEWMAC as an associate member for football to join the Landmark Conference, as it had announced that it will sponsor that sport beginning the 2023 fall season (2023–24 academic year), effective after the 2022 fall season (2022–23 academic year).
 2022 - The State University of New York Maritime College will join the NEWMAC as an associate member for football, effective in the 2023 fall season (2023-24 academic year).
 2022 - Salve Regina University will join the NEWMAC, effective the 2023–24 academic year.

Member schools

Current members 
The NEWMAC currently has 11 full members; all but one are private schools:

Notes

Future member 
The NEWMAC will have one new full member, which will also be a private school:

Former member 
The NEWMAC had one former full member, which was also a private school:

Notes

Affiliate members 
The NEWMAC currently has four affiliate members, all but two are private schools:

Future affiliate member 
The NEWMAC will have one new affiliate member, which is a public school:

Former affiliate member 
The NEWMAC had two former affiliate members:

Membership timeline

Sports
The NEWMAC sponsors intercollegiate athletic competition in the following sports:

References

External links